A type designer is a person who designs typefaces. (The term "typographer" is sometimes misapplied to type designers: a typographer is a person who arranges existing typefaces to lay out a pagesee typography) 

A partial list of notable type designers follows by country, with a signature typeface (or two for significant designers).

Australia
 Stephen Banham

Brazil
 Eduardo Recife

Canada
 Sara Soskolne (Gotham with Jonathan Hoefler and Tobias Frere-Jones)
 Gerald Giampa
 Ray Larabie
 Jim Rimmer
 Nick Shinn

Czech Republic 

 František Štorm
 Vojtěch Preissig
 Petr Blažek

France 

 George Auriol (Auriol)
 Michel Bouvet
 Louis Braille
 Adolphe Mouron Cassandre (Peignot, 1937)
 Charles Nicolas Cochin
 Simon de Colines
 Firmin Didot
 François Didot
 François-Ambroise Didot
 Henri Didot
 Pierre Didot
 Xavier Dupré
 Roger Excoffon
 Pierre Simon Fournier
 Claude Garamond (Garamond)
 Robert Granjon
 Hector Guimard
 Nicolas Jenson
 Christophe Plantin
 Jean-François Porchez
 Jacques Sabon
 Wynkyn de Worde

Germany 

 Otto Arpke (Taiko)
 Johann Christian Bauer (Fette Fraktur)
 Konrad Friedrich Bauer (Fortune)
 Walter Baum (Fortune)
 Lucian Bernhard (Bernhard Gothic)
 Peter Behrens (Bahrens-Schrift)
 Georg Belwe (Belwe Roman)
 Jakob Erbar (Erbar, Candida, Feder Grotesk, Koloss)
 Johann Gutenberg
 Karlgeorg Hoefer (Elegance, Permanent)
 Heinrich Jost (Bauer Bodoni, Beton)
 Rudolf Koch (Kabel, Neuland, Wilhelm Klingspor Gotisch)
 Paul Renner (Futura, 1927)
 Erik Spiekermann (FF Meta, ITC Officina, FF Info, FF Unit and others)
 Jan Tschichold (Sabon)
 Carlos Winkow designer for the Nacional Typefoundry of Madrid
 Berthold Wolpe (Albertus)
 Gudrun Zapf von Hesse (Diotima, Alcuin)
 Hermann Zapf (Palatino, Optima, Zapf Chancery, Zapf Dingbats, Zapfino)

Israel 
 Henri Friedlaender (Hadassah, Shalom, Hadar, Aviv)
 Eliyahu Koren (Koren)

Italy 
 Raffaello Bertieri (Inkunabula, Paganini)
 Giambattista Bodoni (Bodoni)
 Alessandro Butti (Microgramma, Rondine)
 Francesco Griffo (Bembo, Poliphilus)
 Aldus Manutius
 Aldo Novarese (Novarese, Eurostile, Fenice, Recta, Microgramma, Stop, Expert, Magister, Garaldus, Normandia, Recta, Estro, ...)
 Amoretti Brothers (Amoretti)
 Fabrizio Schiavi (PragmataPro, Sys, Abitare Sans, Siruca…)

Netherlands

 Evert Bloemsma (FF Balance, FF Cocon, FF Avance, FF Legato)
 Jos Buivenga (Anivers, Calluna, Delicious, Diavlo, Fontin, Fertigo, Museo, Questa)
 Wim Crouwel (Catalogue, Fodor, Gridnik, New Alphabet, Stedelijk)
 Bram de Does (TEFF Trinité, TEFF Lexicon)
 Dick Dooijes (Nobel, Contura, Lectura, Rondo, Mercator)
 Lucas de Groot (Thesis, TheAntiqua, Corpid, Calibri)
 Boudewijn Ietswaart (Balduina)
 Jan van Krimpen (Spectrum, Romanée, Romulus, Haarlemmer, Lutetia, Cancellaresca Bastarda)
 Martin Majoor (FF Scala, FF Scala Sans, Telefont, FF Seria, FF Seria Sans, FF Nexus Serif, FF Nexus Sans, FF Nexus Mix)
 Gerrit Noordzij (TEFF Burgundica, TEFF Ruse)
 Albert-Jan Pool (FF DIN, URW Imperial, URW Linear, Mauritius I, FF OCR-F, Jet Set Sans, DTL HEIN GAS, Regenbogen Bold)
 S.H. de Roos (aka Sjoerd de Roos (Hollandsche Mediæval, Grotius, Egmont, Libria, De Roos, Zilvertype)
 Fred Smeijers (OurType, Arnhem, Fresco, Sansa, DTL Nobel, TEFF Renard, FF Quadraat)
 Gerard Unger (Allianz, Amerigo, ANWB fonts, DTL Argo, Big Vesta, Capitoleum, Capitoleum News, Coranto, Decoder, Delftse Poort, Demos, Flora, Gulliver, Hollander, Markeur, M.O.L., Oranda, DTL Paradox, Praxis, Swift, Swift 2.0, Vesta)

New Zealand
 Joseph Churchward
 Kris Sowersby
 Jack Yan

Portugal

 João Miranda (BIG, Calma, Adfuel, Phuc)
 Manuel Pereira da Silva (MPS Rotunda) (deceased)
 Nuno Dias (Meteoric)
 Rafael Serra
 Rúben Dias (Taca)
 Rui Abreu (R-Typography Flecha, Gliko, Staff, Pathos, Sul, Grifo (Grifito & Grifinito), Gira, Usual, Azo, Signo, Aria, Orbe; TDL Aquino with Ricardo Santos)

Russia 
 Solomon Telingater (1903-1969)

Serbia
 Hieromonk Makarije

Slovakia
 Zuzana Licko (Mrs Eaves)
 Peter Biľak (Eureka, Fedra, Greta, History, Irma, Julien, Karloff, Lava)

South Africa
 Margaret Calvert (Transport)

Spain
 Eudald Pradell, punchcutter.

Sweden
 Akke Kumlien (Kumlien Medieval)
 Karl-Erik Forsberg (Berling, Lunda, Carolus, Ericus, Gustavus, Polhem, Carolina Script, Aros Antiqua, and more)
 Bo Berndal (Sispos and Sisneg. Old Swedish standard (SIS 030011, 1973) for public road signs, displays, etc.)
 Franko Luin

Switzerland 
 Adrian Frutiger (1928-2015, Avenir, Frutiger, Univers)
 Karl Gerstner
 Max Miedinger (Helvetica)

Syria 
 Mamoun Sakkal (Shilia, Hasan Al Quds, Al-Futtaim)

Thailand 

 Anuthin Wongsunkakon

United Kingdom 

 Charles Robert Ashbee (Prayer Book)
 Richard Austin (Bel, Porson)
 Paul Barnes (Guardian Egyptian, with Christian Schwartz, 2005)
 Jonathan Barnbrook (Mason, Exocet, 1996 released through Emigre fonts, Nylon, Prototype, Bastarda)
 John Baskerville (Baskerville)
 Robert Besley (Clarendon)
 Neville Brody (Arcadia, 1986, Blur, Auto-Suggestion))
 Matthew Carter (Snell Roundhand, 1965; Shelley Script, 1972; Galliard, 1978; Skia, Georgia, Mantinia, all 1993; Verdana, 1996; Tahoma, 1999)
 William Caslon (Caslon)
 Roy Cole (Lina, 2004)
 Eric Gill (Gill Sans, Perpetua, both 1928; Joanna, 1937)
 Phill Grimshaw (over 44 typefaces including Oberon, Hazel, Gravura, Obelisk, Klepto)
 Robert Harling
 Rian Hughes (Blackcurrant, Custard and numerous others released through Device)
 Edward Johnston (Johnston, 1916)
 Seb Lester (Scene, Soho, Neo Sans and Neo Tech)
 Bruno Maag (Tesco, Tottenham Hotspur, Telewest, Urban Splash, BT, BMW, Vodafone, Nokia Pure) Dalton Maag Type Design
 Stanley Morison (Times New Roman)
 Jeremy Tankard (Bliss, Corbel, Blue Island, Disturbance, Enigma, Aspect)
 Walter Tracy (Jubilee, Adsans, Telegraph Modern, 1969 Times Europa, 1972)

United States 

 Ed Benguiat (over 600 typefaces including Bookman,  and ITC Benguiat)
 Linn Boyd Benton (Century)
 Morris Fuller Benton (America's most prolific type designer, having completed 221 total typefaces, including: Franklin Gothic, Century Schoolbook, News Gothic, Bank Gothic)
 Lucian Bernhard (Bernhard Gothic, Bernhard Modern)
 Charles Bigelow and Kris Holmes, partners in design (Lucida family)
 Joseph Blumenthal, (Spiral, Emerson)
 William H. Bradley
 Sheila Levrant de Bretteville
 Jackson Burke (Trade Gothic, 1948)
 Leslie Cabarga (Magneto, Bad Typ, Casey, Streamline, Raceway)
 Warren Chappell (Lydian series)
 Thomas Maitland Cleland (Della Robbia)
 Vincent Connare (Comic Sans, Trebuchet, Magpie)
 Oswald Bruce 'Oz' Cooper (Cooper Black, 1921)
 Rick Cusick (Nyx)
 Joshua Darden (Freight, Omnes)
 Chank Diesel
 Lawrence O'Donnell (Seglimint, 2006)
 Michael Doret (Metroscript, Deliscript, DeLuxe Gothic, Orion MD, PowerStation)
 William Addison Dwiggins (36 completed typefaces including Electra, Caledonia, Metro)
 Tobias Frere-Jones (Interstate, Gotham, Reactor, plus numerous custom designs for publications including the Wall Street Journal, GQ, Esquire, New York Times Magazine)
 Sidney Gaunt (46 typefaces including Adstyle, Pencraft)
 William S. Gillies   (Gillies Light, Gillies Bold)
 Zuzana Licko   (Filosofia, Triplex, Mrs Eaves etc.)
 Bertram Goodhue (Cheltenham)
 Frederic Goudy (90 completed typefaces including: Copperplate, 1905; Goudy Old Style, 1915; Berkeley Oldstyle, 1938)
 Chauncey H. Griffith (34 typefaces including Bell Gothic, 1937; Poster Bodoni, 1938)
 Victor Hammer (American Uncial)
 Sol Hess (house designer for Lanston Monotype Company where he completed 85 typefaces)
 Jonathan Hoefler (Knockout, Gotham, Sentinel, Mercury, Chronicle, Archer, Verlag, Forza, Hoefler Text, Hoefler Titling, Ideal Sans)
 Kris Holmes (Lucida)
 Dard Hunter (private faces for his Mountain House Press)
 Susan Kare (original Apple Macintosh typeface, 1984)
 Richard Kegler
 Donald Knuth (Computer Modern)
 Raph Levien (Inconsolata, Museum, Century Catalogue)
 Harold Lohner
 Herb Lubalin (Lubalin Graph)
 Douglas Crawford McMurtrie (Ultra-Modern Roman)
 R. Hunter Middleton (99 typefaces including: Stellar, Coronet, Stencil, Delphian, Umbra )
 James Montalbano (Clearview)
 William Dana Orcutt (Humanistic)
 Wadsworth A. Parker (Lexington, Gallia)
 Jim Parkinson
 Joseph W. Phinney (Abbott Old Style, Cloister Black (with M.F. Benton), Camelot (with F. Goudy))
 Will Ransom (Parsons)
 Bruce Rogers (Centaur)
 Rudolph Ruzicka (Fairfield)
 Stefan Sagmeister (Sagmeister, Inc.)
 Christian Schwartz (Neutraface, Amplitude, Guardian Egyptian)
 Tré Seals (Vocal Type Co. Martin, Bayard, Carrie)
 Ralph Fletcher Seymour (private typefaces for his Alderbrink Press)
 Robert Slimbach (Minion, Adobe Garamond, Utopia, Garamond Premier)
 Sumner Stone (Stone Sans, Stone Serif, Stone Informal, Stone Print, Cycles)
 Ilene Strizver
 Tommy Thompson (titling series for Saturday Evening Post and Colliers)
 Carol Twombly (Lithos, Myriad (co-designer), Trajan, Charlemagne, Nueva, Adobe Caslon)
 Frederic Warde (Arrighi)
 Robert Wiebking (31 typefaces as a designer, including: Artcraft, Munder, Advertisers Gothic.  Many more as a punch-cutter.)
 Doyald Young (Young Baroque, Eclat)
 Ross F. George (Sign Painter and type designer)

References

External links
 Type designers, typographers and other fonts people: MyFonts
 Typophile: Type Designers list 
 Klingspor museum digital archive of type designers and type artists
 Linotype: Font Designers

 
Type designers
Independent type foundries
Type designers